Poropuntius huangchuchieni is a species of ray-finned fish in the genus Poropuntius which is found in the upper Mekong River basin and the Red River basin in the Yunnan. It may also occur in these rivers in Laos and northern Vietnam.

References 

huangchuchieni
Taxa named by Tchang Tchung-Lin
Fish described in 1962